Wenne is a river of North Rhine-Westphalia, Germany. The river springs in a forest area near Obringhausen.

It flows through the villages of Niederberndorf, Menkhausen, Grimminghausen (Schmallenberg), Lochtrop, Frielinghausen, Bremke, Wenholthausen and Berge before it flows into the  Ruhr on the left at Wennemen at 234 m above sea level.

Gallery

See also
List of rivers of North Rhine-Westphalia

References

Rivers of North Rhine-Westphalia
Rivers of Germany